Gastroxya is a genus of African orb-weaver spiders first described by Pierre L.G. Benoit in 1962.

Species
 it contains four species:
Gastroxya benoiti Emerit, 1973 – South Africa
Gastroxya krausi Benoit, 1962 – Liberia, Congo
Gastroxya leleupi Benoit, 1962 – Congo
Gastroxya schoutedeni Benoit, 1962 – Congo, Rwanda, Burundi

References

Araneidae
Araneomorphae genera
Spiders of Africa